The Montreal Casino, located in Montreal, Quebec, is the largest casino in Canada. Situated on Notre Dame Island, in Jean-Drapeau Park, it consists of two former Expo 67 pavilion buildings. The casino is open to the public seven days a week, operating morning until late night. It first opened on October 9, 1993. 

The casino is owned and operated by the Société des casinos du Québec (a subsidiary of Loto-Québec), which owns three other casinos in the province.  All profits go to the provincial Government of Quebec. As of 2019, it employed 2,800 people.

Grounds
The casino is located within the St Lawrence river on Notre Dame Island–a man-made island built for the 1967 World's Fair. It is situated within Jean-Drapeau Park, an urban park and former grounds of Expo 67, and shares the island with the Gilles Villeneuve racing circuit, the Olympic Basin and an artificial lake with small beach. 

Access to the casino is served by the Concordia bridge through Cité du Havre, or by public transit via the Jean Drapeau Metro station (on the neighboring Saint Helen's Island) and then boarding a dedicated connecting bus.

History 
In 1992, the government of Quebec created the Société des casinos du Québec (SCQ) and tasked them to build casinos in the province. The Montreal Casino was the first among the two to be founded for the project and cost $95 million to build. The casino replaced the Palais des civilisations which used to showcase international cultural exhibitions, and prior to that was the Quebec Pavilion during Expo 67. It also made use the formerly vacant France pavilion, which was annexed via a constructed bridge way when both buildings were renovated to become the casino.

The casino received thousands of players within the first few weeks of its opening and 780,000 in its first year. During its opening year it employed 700 people.

In 1993, it went through its first major expansion.

In 1997, the Casino became a 24-hour establishment.

In 2003, it became a non-smoking casino since July that year, and the former smoking lounges were closed in May 2006 with the passing of a new provincial law.

In 2013, it saw a second major renovation  when Loto-Québec collaborated with Moment Factory to renew the gaming areas of the casino. The installation featured a digital wall that expanded over three floors. Late the following year, it opened the area dubbed The Zone. 

In 2020, following the COVID-19 pandemic, the casino no longer operated 24 hours, instead closing at 3 AM (a reversal of its 1997 change).

In 2021, the casino's fine dining L'Atelier de Joël Robuchon restaurant permanently closed.

Features and events
The casino consists of three interconnected buildings. Two of these, the France Pavilion and the Québec Pavilion, were built for Expo 67. The third is an annex built by the casino to the south and east of the main building. An enclosed bridge joins the annex to the former Quebec Pavilion. The main building has six floors, in addition to the annex and the secondary building (with four floors). Within the three structures there are over 3,200 slot machines, over 115 gaming tables, Keno facilities, and large number of speed lotteries and virtual games. The casino also contains four restaurants,
three bars,
a cabaret, and meeting and banquet facilities. The casino is known for certain unconventional structural features for such an establishment, such as its numerous windows and low ceilings.

The Montreal Casino holds all kinds of events and shows throughout the year, including band performances, dances, and comedy shows. Most of the events are free for visitors while others charge a fee for tickets. Every year, the casino holds a New Year's party which lasts from the afternoon all the way to the morning of the next day. The casino invites DJs and musicians to the venue and features a giant screen showing the New Year's Eve countdown.

Games
The following table games are offered:
 Blackjack
 Black Jack Switch
 7 extra Side bet
 BJ lucky ladies sidebet
 Baccarat (midi, mini and Macau)
 Roulette (American and European)
 Touch Bet Roulette
 Caribbean Stud Poker
 Pai Gow Poker
 Grand Prix Poker (Let It Ride)
 Three card poker
 Craps
 War
 Sic Bo
 Casino War
 Ultimate Texas Hold'em
 Texas hold 'em poker

Keno scandal 
In April 1994, Daniel Corriveau won $600,000 CAD playing keno. He picked 19 of the 20 winning numbers three times in a row. Corriveau claims he used a computer to discern a pattern in the sequence of numbers, based on chaos theory. However, it was later found that the sequence was easy to predict because the casino was using an inadequate electronic pseudorandom number generator. In fact, the keno machine was reset every morning with the same seed number, resulting in the same sequence of numbers being generated. Corriveau received his winnings after investigators cleared him of any wrongdoing.

See also 
 Expo 67
 Québec Pavilion
 List of casinos in Canada
 Montreal
 Parc Jean-Drapeau
 Polytope de Montréal

References

External links 

 
 Montreal Casino Review

Buildings and structures completed in 1967
Buildings and structures in Montreal
Casinos in Quebec
Expo 67
Music venues in Montreal
Parc Jean-Drapeau
Tourist attractions in Montreal
World's fair architecture in Montreal